Murder in Reverse (also styled Murder in Reverse?) is a 1945 British thriller film directed by Montgomery Tully and starring William Hartnell, Jimmy Hanley and Chili Bouchier. It is based on the story Query by "Seamark" (Austin J. Small).

A successful film in its time, Murder in Reverse was shown at the British Film Institute on the big screen in June 2010 to great success, selling out the auditorium.

Plot
Tom Masterick works as a stevedore in Limehouse, London and is a married man with a young daughter. After discovering his wife has been having an affair with a man named Fred Smith, he fights him in a saloon bar which continues through the streets, before they both end up high on a docks crane, from which Smith falls. Following a police investigation and court trial, Masterick is sentenced to death for Smith's murder which he insists he did not commit, although this is commuted to 15 years imprisonment. Upon release, he seeks to find the truth about what happened to the murder "victim", who he is adamant he saw alive following his arrest. After his wife disappeared with her lover, their daughter Jill was adopted by a close friend and grew up with no memory of her real parents or early childhood.

Masterick is friendly with a newspaper editor named Sullivan, who had unsuccessfully tried to change the public opinion of the case in favour of Masterick during his early incarceration. Sullivan had adopted his daughter, who had grown up living a happy life and he wishes for her not to learn of her true identity. Masterick agrees, expressing his only desire is to see real justice done and discover the truth about the fate of Smith. Jill, who is in a relationship with junior reporter Peter Rogers, becomes involved in the case and learns of Masterick's incarceration and miscarriage of justice, oblivious he is her real father.

Following a period of private investigation, Masterick finds his former wife, now abandoned by Smith and living a destitute life. She discloses the location of where Smith can be found but is unsuccessful in her attempt to reconcile with Masterick, who only desires justice for his wrongful incarceration.

Masterick finds Smith running a public house and upon Smith believing he is not out to avenge him, the two agree to split any compensation Masterick believes he will secure for his wrongful prison sentence. The pair visit the judge who originally presided over the case, who is entertaining guests at a dinner party. Masterick explains there has been a miscarriage of justice and the murder victim is alive and well, standing right next to him. Believing that the judge is unwilling to help Masterick clear his name due to the passage of time, Masterick shoots Smith in full view of the judge and his friends, murdering him.

During the epilogue, Sullivan comments that Masterick cannot be convicted of the murder of Smith, as he has already served a 15 year prison sentence for his murder. The crime has in effect been a murder in reverse.

Cast

Production
The film is based on the story Query by Seamark and featured Dartmoor prison. It was among the first films directed by "prolific" director Montgomery Tully, who had previously worked on many short films during World War II.

Release
The film saw a general cinema release rather than having a West End showing, due to being an independent production.

Reception
According to trade papers, the film performed well at the British box office in 1945. Reviewing the film in 1949, The Philadelphia Inquirer praised it highly, describing the film as building to "a tricky climax which leaves the audience breathless and virtually able to write its own ending". They particularly highlighted the performances of Hartnell as "extraordinarily good as the betrayed husband", while noted other cast such as Slater, Sheridan and Bouchier as being "excellent". The Saffron Walden Weekly News also praised the film as an "amazing story", noting that Hartnell gave an "outstanding performance". The Middlesex Advertiser and County Gazette also praised the film highly, describing it as a "really first-rate adventure yarn filled with vivid characters brought to life by a lengthy cast of experienced British players". It was considered a "good British film" by the Birmingham Post, who remarked that it was "a change to find a picture which has the courage to treat a serious matter seriously".

References

External links
 
 
Review of film at Variety

1945 films
1940s English-language films
1940s British films
1940s thriller films
Films about miscarriage of justice
Films directed by Montgomery Tully
British black-and-white films
British thriller films
Films shot at British National Studios